The Ezana Stone is an ancient stele still standing in modern day Axum in Ethiopia, the centre of the ancient Kingdom of Aksum. This stone monument, that probably dates from the 4th century of the Christian era, documents the conversion of King Ezana to Christianity and his conquest of various neighbouring areas, including Meroë.

From AD 330 to 356, King Ezana ruled the ancient Kingdom of Aksum centred in the Horn of Africa. He fought against the Nubians, and commemorated his victories on stone tablets in praise of God. These liturgical epigraphs were written in various ancient languages, including the Ethiopian Semitic Ge'ez, the South Arabian Sabaean, and Greek. The king's engravings in stone provided a trilingual monument in different languages, similar to the Rosetta stone.

The Ethiopian Orthodox Tewahedo Church had its beginnings during this period. Rufinus's Ecclesiastical History narrates that Saint Frumentius, a freed slave and tutor for the very young King, converted him to Christianity. Towards the end of his reign, King Ezana launched a campaign against the Kushites around 350 which brought down the Kingdom of Kush. Various stone inscriptions written in Ge'ez (using the Ge'ez script) have been found at Meroë, the central city of the Kushites.

Text

Greek translation

Ge'ez translation

Sabaean translation

See also
Hawulti (monument)
King Ezana's Stele
Obelisk of Axum
Rosetta Stone

References

Notes

External links
National Geographic article
Harden, J. M., "An introduction to Ethiopic Christian Literature" (1926) Chapter II, "Brief Historical Sketch of the Country and Church", contains a discussion of this inscription

4th-century artefacts
4th-century inscriptions
Texts in Ge'ez
Greek inscriptions
Multilingual texts
Axumite steles
Axum (city)
Archaeology of Eastern Africa